Petrophile wonganensis is a species of flowering plant in the family Proteaceae and is endemic to south-western Western Australia. It is a dense shrub with blunt, needle-shaped leaves, and more or less spherical heads of hairy, yellow flowers.

Description
Flowering occurs from August to January and the fruit is a nut, fused with others in a more or less spherical head  in diameter.

Taxonomy
Petrophile wonganensis was first formally described in 1995 by Donald Bruce Foreman in Flora of Australia from material collected by James Henderson Ross near Wongan Hills in 1984. The specific epithet (wonganensis) refers to the type location.

Distribution and habitat
This petrophile mainly occurs near Wongan Hills and towards Cowcowing, in the Avon Wheatbelt biogeographic region. It grows in heath and shrubland in sand or sandy loam.

Conservation status
This petrophile is classified as "not threatened" by the Western Australian Government Department of Parks and Wildlife.

References

wonganensis
Eudicots of Western Australia
Endemic flora of Western Australia
Plants described in 1995